Shirley Anne Field (born Shirley Broomfield; 27 June 1938) is an English actress who has performed on stage, film and television since 1955, prominent during the British New Wave.

Early life

Broomfield was born in Forest Gate, Essex (now in the London Borough of Newham). She was the third of four children, with two elder sisters and a younger brother, Earnest "Guy" Broomfield (c. 1939–1999). Her brother was murdered, in 1999, by Harry Dalsey, the son of Adrian Dalsey.

At the age of six, Shirley was placed in the National Children's Home at Edgworth, near Bolton, Lancashire and four years later was moved to another children's home in Blackburn, where she attended Blakey Moor School for Girls. She subsequently returned to Edgworth until she was 15, when she moved to a children's home hostel in London, training as a typist while still attending school.

Acting career

Early roles
After a course at the Lucie Clayton School and Model Agency, she became a photographic model for pin-up magazines like Reveille and Titbits. She was subsequently spotted by Bill Watts, who ran a theatrical agency and obtained for her roles in late 1950s British films, usually uncredited.

Her first appearance in a film was as an extra in Simon and Laura (1955). She had small parts in All for Mary (1955), Lost (1956), Yield to the Night (1956) (directed by J. Lee Thompson), It's Never Too Late (1956), It's a Wonderful World (1956), The Weapon (1956), Loser Takes All (1956), The Silken Affair (1956), Dry Rot (1956), The Good Companions (1957) (again for Thompson), Seven Thunders (1957), and The Flesh Is Weak (1957). She was in episodes of The New Adventures of Martin Kane (1957) and International Detective.

Field's first sizeable film role was in Horrors of the Black Museum (1959). She had minor parts in Once More, with Feeling! (1960) and And the Same to You (1960). Field had a larger role in the controversial Peeping Tom (1960). She appeared on stage in The Lily White Boys with Albert Finney.

Stardom

In 1960, Field's breakthrough came when she was chosen by Tony Richardson to play the role of model Tina Lapford in The Entertainer (1960), starring Laurence Olivier, distributed by Bryanston Films. Half a century later, she clarified that she did not owe her break to Olivier: "It was Tony Richardson I owe it all to."

Field had a supporting role in Beat Girl (1960), then appeared in probably her best known role as Doreen, the would-be girlfriend of rebellious Arthur Seaton (played by Albert Finney), in the New Wave film for Bryanston, Saturday Night and Sunday Morning (1960). Director, Karel Reisz, described her as "difficult to play with". Co-star Finney had previously had a small role in The Entertainer. The film was a huge hit.

Field starred alongside Kenneth More in Man in the Moon (1960). With those three big film starring roles in 1960, she became one of the very few actors ever to have their name above the titles in all the major cinemas around Leicester Square simultaneously.

Although offered a role in A Kind of Loving (1962), Field turned it down to play the female lead in a Hollywood financed film, The War Lover (1962), with Steve McQueen. Four decades later, she admitted that the shoot was not ideal: 

In the UK, Field had the lead in Lunch Hour (1962), which was one of her favorite films.

For Hammer films, Field starred in The Damned (1963), directed by Joseph Losey. She went to Hollywood to play the female lead in an epic directed by J. Lee Thompson, Kings of the Sun (1963). Thompson had her under personal contract at this stage. She says she turned down roles in a James Bond movie and an Elvis Presley movie.

Field went to Italy to appear in The Wedding March (1966), then back in England made Doctor in Clover (1966) and Alfie (1966). She had a supporting role in Hell Is Empty (1967).

Later career
Field starred in With Love in Mind (1970) and A Touch of the Other (1970), then made House of the Living Dead (1974).

By the late 1970s Field was more commonly seen on TV, in shows such as Centre Play, Shoestring, Buccaneer, Never the Twain and a long run on Santa Barbara as well as TV movies like Two by Forsyth. She had roles in films like My Beautiful Laundrette (1985), Shag (1989), Getting It Right (1989), The Rachel Papers (1989), Hear My Song (1991), UFO (1993), Taking Liberty (1993), Loving Deadly (1994), and At Risk (1994).

Later TV included Anna Lee: Headcase (1993), Murder She Wrote, Lady Chatterly, Rumble, Bramwell, Barbara, Madson, Dalziel and Pascoe, The Bill, Where the Heart Is, Waking the Dead, Monarch of the Glen, Last of the Summer Wine, Doctors. Her most recent films are The Kid, The Power of Three and Beautiful Relics.

Personal life
On 7 July 1967, Field married the aristocratic RAF pilot and racing driver Charles Crichton-Stuart (1939–2001). They had a daughter, Nicola Crichton-Stuart, who was born in 1969. The marriage ended in divorce during the late 1970s. Her autobiography, A Time for Love, was published in 1991.

On 14 November 1993, Field appeared on BBC Radio 4's Desert Island Discs, talking to Sue Lawley about her upbringing in different children's homes in Northern England and her success as an actress in the 1960s. She also reminisced about her friendship with John F. Kennedy and an ill-fated date with Frank Sinatra. Her record choices included Beethoven's Piano Concerto No. 1 in C major and pieces by Rachmaninov, Elvis Presley and the Carpenters.

In the September 2009 issue of Cinema Retro, there was a long interview with Field, where she candidly talked about her childhood and the making of Peeping Tom, The Entertainer, Beat Girl and The War Lover.

Filmography

 Lost (1955) as Taxi driver's daughter (uncredited)
 Dry Rot (1956) as Waitress in Cafe (uncredited)
 Loser Takes All (1956) as Girl at Roulette Table  
 It's a Wonderful World (1956) as Pretty Girl
 The Flesh Is Weak (1957) as Susan
 The Good Companions (1957) as Redhead
 Horrors of the Black Museum (1959) as Angela Banks
 Upstairs and Downstairs (1959)
 Jungle Street (later renamed Jungle Street Girls) (1960) as Jaqui
 Man in the Moon (1960) as Polly
 Beat Girl (1960) as Dodo
 Once More, with Feeling! (1960) as Angela Hopper
 And the Same to You (1960) as Iris Collins
 Peeping Tom (1960) as Diane Ashley
 The Entertainer (1960) as Tina Lapford
 Saturday Night and Sunday Morning (1960) as Doreen
 Lunch Hour (1962) as Girl 
 The War Lover (1962) as Daphne
 The Damned (1963) as Joan
 Kings of the Sun (1963) as Ixchel
 Doctor in Clover (1966) as Nurse Bancroft
 Alfie (1966) as Carla
 A Touch of the Other (1970) as Elaine
 House of the Living Dead (1974) as Mary Anne Carew
 My Beautiful Laundrette (1985) as Rachel
 Getting It Right (1989) as Anne
 Shag (1989) as Mrs. Clatterback
 The Rachel Papers (1989) as Mrs. Smith
 Hear My Song (1991) as Cathleen Doyle
 Loving Deadly (1994) as Madame
 Christie Malry's Own Double-Entry (2000) as Mary, the Mother of Christie
 The Kid (2010) as Margaret
 The Power of Three (2011) as Jenni

Selected television appearances 

 Santa Barbara
 Monarch of the Glen
 Where the Heart Is
 The Bill
 Dalziel and Pascoe episode "Recalled to Life" 
 Murder, She Wrote
 Never the Twain
 Upstairs, Downstairs
 Last of the Summer Wine
 Shoestring
 Doctors
 Bramwell, season 1, episode 2 ("The Threat of Reprise") as Peggy Heart

References

Bibliography

External links
  - Retrieved 2012-12-07
 Shirley Anne Field at BFI Screenonline - Retrieved 2012-12-07
 
 Field of Dreams, four-page interview with Shirley Anne Field in the September 2009 issue of Cinema Retro - Retrieved 2012-12-07

1936 births
English film actresses
English television actresses
Living people
People from Bolton
People from Forest Gate